The Package Tour was a co-headlining tour featuring American bands New Kids on the Block, 98 Degrees and Boyz II Men. Beginning May 2013, the groups performed nearly fifty shows in North America.

Background
The tour was officially announced during a surprise appearance on The View. Boyz II Men and 98 Degrees performed a cappella versions of their classics. The double entendre name was created by Joey McIntyre. The trek is described as nostalgia trip for the fans. All three bands have expressed giving their loyal fans a show they've been waiting for. Unlike NKOTB's previous touring effort, all three bands will not perform as one. They will each perform their own section of a three-hour show. During an interview with Newsday, Donnie Wahlberg expressed the groups will sing their hits, alongside new material. He continued to say, "We’ll have plenty of surprises! With all those egos in one building at the same time! You know there's going to be a lot of crazy and fun stuff going on. We’re gonna pull out a lot of surprises every night. We’re going to try and pull in as many special guests as we can, and do as many fun things as we can".

Setlist

Tour dates

Festivals and other miscellaneous performances
This concert is a part of "Summerfest"
This concert is a part of the "Summer MixTape Festival"

Cancellations and rescheduled shows

Box office score data

Critical response
The tour has received raved reviews from many music critics. Many have commented on the stage presence of the three acts and how well they connect with fans. Glenn Gamboa (Newsday) writes the bands proved they were the top touring act of the year. He continues, "They certainly didn’t skimp on the spectacle. What was more impressive, though, was the way they placed their music into the context of what has come before and after them". For the show in Montreal, Bernard Perusse (The Gazette) stated the concert was a night for nostalgia. He says, [The bands] were never anything less than consummately professional and highly energetic, delivering almost the entire set from a stage on the floor of the arena. Confetti, balloons, plumes of smoke and fire, lasers, hydraulic risers and other eye-popping extras punctuated the music". Nick Krewen (Toronto Star) gave the show at the Air Canada Centre four stars. He explained, "Almost more shocking is how seasoned NKOTB have become as performers. Aside from the usual bells and whistles like balloons, streamers, rising hydraulic platforms, open flames and lasers, the quintet offered the right balance of tease ’n’ please".

External links
The Package Tour Twitter
The Package Tour Facebook
NKOTB Official Website
Boyz II Men Official Website
98 Degrees website

References

2013 concert tours
New Kids on the Block concert tours
Co-headlining concert tours